HMS Algerine was the lead ship of her namesake class of minesweepers built for the Royal Navy during World War II, the s. Initially assigned to the North Sea, she was transferred to lead the 12th Minesweeping Flotilla. The Flotilla were posted to the Mediterranean to assist with Operation Torch.

Description 

The ship mounted one single 4-inch (102 mm) Mk V gun. Algerine had four single mounts for  Oerlikon 20 mm autocannon, and she was fitted with two depth charge rails, and four depth charge throwers.

Career 

Algerine was laid down on 15 March 1941, by Harland & Wolff, Belfast, and launched on 22 December 1941. She was the eighth ship of the Royal Navy to be named . After being completed, the ship was commissioned on 24 March 1942, and adopted by Sittingbourne due to a Warship Week campaign.

Algerine joined the 9th Minesweeping Flotilla in May 1942 and began action in minesweeping, escorting, and patrolling duties on the east side of England. She was proposed as leader for the 12th Minesweeping Flotilla, which would participate in action abroad. In October, she was put forward to go to the Mediterranean to assist Operation Torch, but her departure was delayed due to repair work. The other four ships in her flotilla left for Gibraltar as escorts to a convoy. Four days after the other ships left, Algerine escorted convoy KMF1 to Oran.

Fate
On 15 November, Algerine and Alarm were positioned off Bougie, clearing mines. The mission had been successful, with 46 mines cleared; but, Algerine was torpedoed by the Italian  , commanded by Lieutenant commander Rino Erler. The submarine had first fired two torpedoes at the middle ship in the trio, then fired another two torpedoes at the last ship, Algerine: Algerine suffered heavy casualties and sank. The auxiliary anti-aircraft ship  rescued 32 men, of whom only 8 survived, internal wounds killing 24. The survivors had been on a Carley raft. The final death toll was 84.

References

Bibliography

External links
  HMS Algerine at naval.history.net
 HMS Algerine at uboat.net

 

Algerine-class minesweepers of the Royal Navy
World War II minesweepers of the United Kingdom
Ships built in Belfast
Ships built by Harland and Wolff
World War II escort ships of the United Kingdom
Ships sunk by Italian submarines
World War II shipwrecks in the Mediterranean Sea
Maritime incidents in November 1942